Time in Tuvalu is given by Tuvalu Time (TVT; UTC+12:00). Tuvalu Time does not have an associated daylight saving time.

Tuvalu is located at the  longitude of 176° to 180°, west of the International Date Line.

IANA time zone database
In the IANA time zone database, Tuvalu is given one time zone:

References